Whitegate is a village on the R352 regional road in northeastern County Clare, Ireland. New houses have been built along the main street. Local pubs include 'The Half Barrel' and 'The Nightingale'.

It is part of the Catholic parish Mountshannon-Whitegate. The former local church, which had been in disuse for some years, is now a warehouse and lumberyard. A newer church has been erected in 1969.

See also
List of towns and villages in Ireland

References

Towns and villages in County Clare